Nakanoshima Station (中の島駅) is a Sapporo Municipal Subway station in Toyohira-ku, Sapporo, Hokkaido, Japan. The station number is N11.

Platforms

Surrounding area
 Nakanoshima Shrine
 Nakanoshima Post Office
 Nakanoshima Police Station
 Nakanoshima Children's Hall, Sapporo Nakanoshima
 Toyohira Welfare center
 Public Works Research Institute, IAI
 Salmon Fisheries Research Center, IAI

External links

 Sapporo Subway Stations

 

Railway stations in Japan opened in 1971
Railway stations in Sapporo
Sapporo Municipal Subway
Toyohira-ku, Sapporo